Tun Baga Tarkhan or  Alp Qutlugh Bilge Qaghan  — was the fourth leader of Uyghur Khaganate.

Background 
There is an uncertainty regarding Tun Baga Tarkhan's relation to ruling Yaglakar clan. His father's name is absent from Chinese documents. However an epitaph was recently found in 2010 in Xian belonged to one of the Uyghur princes, Prince Gechuai (葛啜王子), who died of cold fever on 11 June 795 and was buried on 28 June 795. Luo Xin, historian at Peking University, proposed that he was in fact a younger brother of Yaoluoge Dunmohe. The epitaph stated that the Prince's father's name was Chabish Tegin (车毗尸特勤), Luo Xin established him as the prince who fought against An Lushan in 757. So, according to him, Tun Baga Tarkhan was a nephew to Bögü Qaghan, as well as grandson of Bayanchur. Li Bi also considered him as cousin of Bögü Qaghan.

Life 
His exact birth date is unknown. He earlier participated in Uyghur army against An Lushan under military title Alp Tutuq in 757. He was a chief minister in Uyghur court and perhaps one of supporters of Pugu Huai'en's revolt in 764–765. However he later switched to Tang side after his death. His uncle Khan Tudun was also a minister. He was a fervent anti-Manichaean, therefore adoption of Manichaeism by Bögü was unfavorable according to him. Bögü's new plan on invading Tang dynasty due to pressure from Manichaean clergy caused him to establish his own anti-war faction. He appealed to khagan, saying:

Unable to accomplish his task, he murdered Bögü and his followers among him in 779/780, went on to declare himself a qaghan.

Reign 
He was invested with Chinese title Wuyi Chenggon Qaghan from Emperor Dezong on 28 July 780. His first order was to repeal protection of Manicheans and Sogdians living in China. This also rendered Uyghurs in China defenceless. His uncle Tudun was thus murdered on 7 September 780. His body was brought back to Uyghur capital in 782 when the embassy was greeted by Tun Baga's new chancellor (İl Ögesi in Old Uyghur) Inanchu Bilge (頡千逝斯) of Xiedie (𨁂跌) clan, who would later rise to be an important member of khaganate. Tun Baga demanded blood money from Dezong in order to not to start a war later.

Marriage to Princess Xian'an 
As an effort to obtain an alliance, Tun Baga sent an emissary to Tang China for a marriage proposal on 2 October 787. Emperor Dezong hated the Uyghurs, ever since several of his attendants were tortured and killed by Bögü Qaghan in 762 while he was still a prince and therefore refused. Only after repeated attempts by Li Bi that that grudge should not be borne against the current khagan as well as repeated analyses of how crucial the Huige alliance would be did Emperor Dezong agree — particularly after Li Bi, who had strong friendships with both khagan and the Uyghur chancellor Inanchu Bilge extracted promises from khagan to submit to Tang as a subject as a matter of formality. Emperor Dezong was pleased, and subsequently, the treaty was cemented with the betrothal of Emperor Dezong's daughter Princess Xian'an to khagan. Marriage ceremony was well documented in New Book of Tang. Delegation of men consisted of 1000 people and was headed by chancellor Inanchu Bilge, women delegation was led by Kutluk Bilge Konchuy, khagan's younger sister. Qaghan also asked Emperor to change Chinese name for Uyghurs - Huihu (回鶻) to Huihe (回紇). He also received a new Chinese title Changshou Tianqin Qaghan along with the princess who was created Zhihuiduan Zhengshou Xiaoshun Khatun on 30 November 788.

Death

He died in December 789 and succeeded by his son. According to Luo Xin, he as posthumously renamed Bögü Bilge Tengri Qaghan.

Family 
He was married to Princess Xian'an, daughter of Emperor Dezong of Tang on 30 November 788. He had at least two sons from other wives:

 Külüg Qaghan - Ruled Uyghur Khaganate in 790
 Another son whose name was not preserved.

He also had at least two younger brothers:

 Prince Gechuai (or Qari Chor) - born in 776, died in 795 in Chang'an.
 Apa Chor (was alive in 795)

References 

789 deaths
8th-century Turkic people
8th-century monarchs in Asia
Yaglakar clan
Tengrist monarchs
Regicides